Sweet chestnut of Ovacık village is a very old chestnut tree in Izmir Province, western Turkey.  It is a registered natural monument of the country.

The chestnut tree is located at Ovacık Highland close to Ovacık village in Bayındır district of Izmir Province. It is a sweet chestnut (Castanea sativa). Its age is dated to be about 500 years old.

The tree was registered a natural monument on February 21, 1995.

References

İzmir Province
Natural monuments of Turkey
Protected areas established in 1995
1995 establishments in Turkey
Bayındır District
Individual trees in Turkey